South Palmyra Township (T11N R8W) is located in Macoupin County, Illinois, United States. As of the 2010 census, its population was 747 and it contained 380 housing units.

Geography

South Palmyra Twp: (header font slightly different from Jefferson Co.)

Demographics

Adjacent townships
 North Palmyra Township (north)
 North Otter Township (northeast)
 South Otter Township (east)
 Carlinville Township (southeast)
 Bird Township (south)
 Western Mound Township (southwest)
 Barr Township (west)
 Scottville Township (northwest)

References

External links
US Census
City-data.com
Illinois State Archives

Townships in Macoupin County, Illinois
Townships in Illinois